Pićan ( Chakavian: Pićon) is a village and municipality in the central part of Istria, Croatia, 12 km southeast of Pazin; elevation 360 m. The chief occupations are agriculture and livestock breeding. It is situated on the D64 state road (Pazin-Kršan-Vozilići). There is a railway station on the former Lupoglav – Raša railway.

History 

In Roman times, a military stronghold called Petina was located here. The town was the seat of the first diocese in central Istria from the 5th to 18th centuries, and a medieval commune with governors and officers. The town gate (14th-15th century) has been preserved.

Diocese of Pićan 

Many of the local bishops are buried in the church nave. Its 48 m bell tower stands separate from the church; it is the third highest in Istria and offers a good view.

The treasury contains chalices from the 15th century and a monstrance from the 16th century.

Senj-Modruš's bishop Sebastijan Glavinić of Glamoč (1630–1697) was born in Potpićan near Pićan and was buried in St. George's Church in Slovenske Konjice, Slovenia.

Martin of Pićan, a bishop of Pićan, was the general vicar of Carniola and had his seat in Ljubljana (then named Laibach) before the establishment of the Diocese of Ljubljana in 1461. In 1456, he was buried in the town's St. Nicholas's Church, the predecessor of the modern Ljubljana Cathedral, and has retained a gravestone in the cathedral.

References

External links

 Pićan official tourist site

Municipalities of Croatia
Populated places in Istria County